John Reed King (October 25, 1914 – July 8, 1979) was an American radio and television game show host who hosted numerous game shows during the 1930s, 1940s, and 1950s.

Career
King was one of the announcers for The American School of the Air on CBS, and he had one of the top-rated radio shows of the 1930s in New York City with Missus Goes A-Shopping. He was also an announcer for the radio version of Death Valley Days and for The Jack Berch Show.

On August 1, 1944, he hosted the live television version of Missus Goes A-Shopping, and on January 29, 1946, he hosted the television version of It's a Gift, making these among the first television quiz shows ever aired, after CBS Television Quiz (1941-1942).

In the late 1940s and early 1950s, King was host of The John Reed King Show, an audience-participation quiz show. It began on WOR-TV and moved to WCBS-TV on February 2, 1950.

He worked at KDKA radio and television in Pittsburgh, Pennsylvania during the 1960s. He was a morning news anchor for the radio station, and hosted a daily talk show on television. In 1970, he was a news anchor at KGO-TV, the ABC owned-and-operated television station in San Francisco, California.

Personal life
He was married to Jean Abbot King and had three children, Joanne King, Julianne King, and John Reed King Jr.

Radio Shows, Host
Missus Goes A-Shopping (1934-1944) CBS Radio and local NYC
Our Gal Sunday (1937-1940) announcer
Duffy's Tavern (1941-1942) announcer
The Gay Nineties Revue (1941) announcer
What's My Name? (1941)
Double or Nothing (1944 - 1945)
Death Valley Days and The Sheriff (1945-1951) announcer
Give and Take (1945-1953) CBS
Chance of a Lifetime (1949-1952) ABC 
Sky King (1954) playing the part of Sky King

Television Shows, Host
Missus Goes A-Shopping (1944-1949) CBS Television
It's a Gift (1946) CBS
King's Party Line (1946)
The John Reed King Show (1949)
Chance of a Lifetime (1950-1952) ABC; (1953-1955) (DuMont)
Battle of the Ages (1952)
Beat the Clock (1952)
Where Was I? (1952-1953) DuMont
What's Your Bid? (Feb-April 1953) ABC
There's One In Every Family (1952-1953) CBS
Give and Take (1952-1953) CBS
Why? (1953)
Let's See (1954) ABC
Have a Heart (1955) DuMont
Gunsmoke, episode "Old Comrade" (1962) guest starred as a townsman

Books
John Reed King's Quiz and Game Book (1949)

References

External links

1914 births
1979 deaths
American television personalities